Viasat Sport 2 was a Scandinavian soccer channel. The channel started February 1, 2004 together with Viasat Sport 3. Viasat Sport 2 has the rights to Manchester United TV and Chelsea TV. Viasat Sport 2 also shows the UEFA Champions League, the Dutch Eredivise, the Danish SAS Ligaen, the French Ligue 1, the UEFA Euro Qualifications, the FA Cup, The Italian Serie A, Football League Championship, Coppa Italia and the World Cup qualifications.

The channel was available in Norway, Sweden, Denmark, Finland, Estonia, Lithuania and Latvia along with its sister channel Viasat Sport 3. On October 16, 2008, Viasat relaunched their sports channels in Norway and Sweden. Viasat Sport 2 and 3 were replaced by Viasat Fotboll (in Sweden), Viasat Sport Norway (in Norway) and Viasat Motor (in both Sweden and Norway). The channels did however continue in Denmark, Finland and the Baltics until January 6, 2009. In the Baltics, the channels were replaced by Viasat Sport Baltic, while there was no replacements in Denmark and Finland.

References

V Sport
Modern Times Group
Television channels and stations established in 2004
Television channels and stations disestablished in 2009
Defunct television channels in Sweden
Defunct television channels in Norway
Defunct television channels in Denmark
Defunct television channels in Finland
Defunct television channels in Estonia